Pseudochattonella is a genus of marine, heterokont flagellates belonging to the class of Dictyochophyceae. It currently comprises two species: Pseudochattonella verruculosa and Pseudochattonella farcimen

References 

Heterokont genera
Dictyochophyceae